British Supersport Championship is a support series to the British Superbike Championship (BSB) for engine capacities smaller than Superbike. British Supersport runs one or two rounds per weekend at each BSB event. The BSS championship is seen as a stepping stone for the younger talent to progress to the British Superbike Championship or to World level classes. Riders such as: Tom Sykes, Cal Crutchlow, Sam Lowes, Alex Lowes, Jonathan Rea and Leon Camier all raced in this championship during their early careers.

From 2018, a new British GP2 class was introduced to be run within existing Supersport races. Devised by MSVR, it is based on Moto2 Honda-engined machines.

From 2023 season onwards, new engine regulations are in force allowing larger engines to be used, dependent on the number of cylinders, from manufacturers such as Ducati and MV.

Race weekend
Friday
 Practice 1 (40 Mins)
 Practice 2 (40 Mins)

Saturday
 Qualifying (30 minutes)
 Sprint race (reduced laps)

Sunday
 Warm Up (10 Mins)
 Full race

Scoring system

Machines used

Supersport
 Ducati Panigale V2
 Honda CBR600RR
 Kawasaki Ninja ZX-6R, Kawasaki 636
 Suzuki GSX-R600, Suzuki 750 
 Triumph Daytona 675, Triumph 765
 Yamaha YZF-R6
 MV F3 675, MV 800

* For the 2021 season, oversize engines were allowed as a 'pilot' scheme prior to full implementation in 2022
* From 2022, machines including extra capacity engines followed FIM homologation requirements

British GP2
 Various chassis makes, as seen in Moto2; when previously competed in Moto2, using only Honda 600 cc engines
 Any other chassis (or modified stock chassis)
 Four cylinder engines over 400 cc to 600 cc
 Three cylinder engines over 500 cc to 675 cc

British Supersport Champions

British GP2 Champions

See also
 Superbike racing
 Grand Prix motorcycle racing

References

External links
 BSS Home

 
British Supersport Championship
British Supersport Championship
British Supersport Championship
National championships in the United Kingdom
Motorcycle racing in the United Kingdom